Sangvi is a village in Parola Taluka of Jalgaon district in northwestern part of the state of Maharashtra, India.

Geography
It has an average elevation of 197 metres (649 feet).

Sangvi lies in the Khandesh region, and on Agra - Mumbai National Highway 6.

References

Villages in Jalgaon district